Roman Kariolou (born 1983) is a Cypriot pianist and composer for TV and film. In addition to compositions for events in media and sport, he has written incidental and theme music for over fifty TV films and series as well as a number of documentaries since 2007.

Specialising in TV and documentary film music, he has composed for BBC, CBS, ZDF, ORF, Discovery Channel, Arte and RAI TV series. He has also been composed to write official songs and music for sport and media opening ceremonies, including the 2006 Winter Olympics in Turin and the official song for the EHF's Champions League.

Education
He received violin lessons from the age of three and was invited to the Yehudi Menuhin School by Menuhin himself aged five. He was considered a child prodigy and performed in Vienna, London, Prague and Athens during his childhood. Thanks to a Zakhar Bron grant he studied for a year at the Musikhochschule Lübeck before moving in 1991 to the Universität für Musik und darstellende Kunst Wien, where he was taught by Jewgenia Tschugajewa. He continued his studies at the Mozarteum and under Tibor Varga at the Musikhochschule Graz. In 2004 he took a course in film-music at the Film Music Institute Los Angeles.

Selected filmography

TV documentaries
 2006–2017: Universum (18 episodes)
 2015: Wüstenkönige – Die Löwen der Namib
 2007: Die Gräfin und die russische Revolution 
 2007: Entdecker der Wellness (2 episodes)
 2014: Wo sich Himmel und Erde begegnen – 900 Jahre Stift Klosterneuburg
 2017: Universum History – Maria Theresia – Majestät und Mutter
 2015–2018: Terra Mater (7 episodes)

TV drama series
 2012: Tatort (1 episode, 'Kein Entkommen')
 2013: Die Landärztin (1 episode, 'Vergissmeinnicht')
 2014 onwards: Landkrimi
 2014: Steirerblut 
 2018: Steirerkind
 2019: Steirerkreuz
 2016: Das Sacher (1 episode, 'In bester Gesellschaft')
 2017: Tatort (1 episode, 'Virus')
 2017–2019: Maria Theresia
 2019: Vienna Blood

TV film
 2008: Das Musikhotel am Wolfgangsee
 2011: Die Schatten, die dich holen 
 2011: Die Abstauber
 2013: Alles Schwindel 
 2013: Die verbotene Frau 
 2014: Die Kraft, die Du mir gibst 
 2015: Kleine große Stimme 
 2017: Für dich dreh ich die Zeit zurück 
 2019: Der beste Papa der Welt 
 2020: Schönes Schlamassel

Prizes, awards and nominations 
 2009: Wiener Filmmusik-Preis
 2016: US International Film- and Video Festival Award, for Vanishing Kings
 2017: Gold Camera Award;:US International Video Festival, for Europe's Last Nomads

Nominations
 2013: Best Music, for The Empress and the Forest, Green Screen Festival, Eckernförde
 2015:Africa's Wild West, National Geographic

References

External links 
  Curriculum Vitae Music Austria
 IMDB entry
 Official website
   Mica-Interview with Roman Kariolou Music Austria

1983 births
Living people
Male classical pianists
21st-century classical pianists
Male film score composers
Male television composers
University of Music and Performing Arts Vienna alumni
Mozarteum University Salzburg alumni
University of Music and Performing Arts Graz alumni
Cypriot film score composers
21st-century male musicians